Gloria Nonzwakazi Swartbooi-Ntombela is a South African politician who currently represents the African National Congress (ANC) in the KwaZulu-Natal Provincial Legislature. She was born in the Eastern Cape and joined the KwaZulu-Natal Provincial Legislature during its second administration from 1999 to 2004. Most recently, she was re-elected to her legislative seat in the 2014 general election, ranked 45th on the ANC's provincial party list, and in the 2019 general election, ranked 34th.

References

External links 
 
 Hon. GN Swartbooi-Ntombela at KwaZulu-Natal Legislature

Living people
Year of birth missing (living people)
African National Congress politicians
21st-century South African politicians
Members of the KwaZulu-Natal Legislature